E 004 is a European B class road in Kazakhstan and Uzbekistan, connecting the cities Kyzylorda – Uchkuduk – Bukhara. It is not signposted in both countries.

Route 

Kyzylorda

Uchkuduk
Bukhara

External links 
 UN Economic Commission for Europe: Overall Map of E-road Network (2007)

International E-road network
European routes in Kazakhstan